Uwe Janson (born 6 November 1959, Königswinter) is a German screenwriter, director and producer. He has worked in Germany and the United Kingdom, including Business with Friends for the British Film Institute and the BBC (1991) and the British-German co-production The Sinking of the Laconia (2010; UK premiere 2011).

Selected filmography
Films
 Verfolgte Wege (1989)
 Heart in the Hand (1991)
  (2002)
TV films
 Business with Friends (1992, short)
 Gefährliche Verbindung (1993)
 Lauras Entscheidung (1994)
 Nur der Sieg zählt (1995)
 Holstein Lovers (1999)
  (2002)
  (2003)
  (2004, based on Baal)
 Lulu (2006, based on Earth Spirit and Pandora's Box)
  (2006, based on Peer Gynt)
 Werther (2008, based on The Sorrows of Young Werther)
  (2009)
 The Sinking of the Laconia (2010)
 Aschenputtel (2011, based on Cinderella)
 Hänsel und Gretel (2012, based on Hansel and Gretel)
  (2013)
 Das Mädchen mit den Schwefelhölzern (2013, based on The Little Match Girl)
 Sechse kommen durch die ganze Welt (2014, based on How Six Made Their Way in the World)
 Die Udo Honig Story (2015)

External links

1959 births
Living people
People from Königswinter
Mass media people from North Rhine-Westphalia
German male screenwriters